The 2009 Friends Provident Trophy was an English county cricket tournament held between 19 April and 25 July 2009. The competition was won by Hampshire Hawks who beat the Sussex Sharks by 6 wickets at Lord's.

Format 
The eighteen first-class counties, joined by the Scottish and Irish national teams were divided into four groups. Each team plays each other twice, with the top two teams from each group progressing to the quarter-final stage. Group winners gain a home draw for the quarter-final. During the group stage, teams are awarded two points for a win, one point for a tie, abandonment or a no result, with no points awarded for a defeat. Teams level on points at the end of the group stage were separated by most wins, followed by results between the two teams, net run rate, followed by most wickets taken per balls bowled in matches achieving a result. Teams that were victorious in the quarter-finals then proceeded to the semi-finals and winners from the semi-finals progressed to the final which was held on 25 July, at Lord's.

Fixtures

Group A

Group B

Group C

Group D

Knockout stage

Quarter finals

Semi finals

Final

References

External links 
 

Friends Provident Trophy seasons
Friends Provident Trophy